Terry Township may refer to:

Canada
Terry Township, Ontario
United States
 Terry Township, Finney County, Kansas
 Terry Township, Bradford County, Pennsylvania